The Príncipe de Asturias (Prince of Asturias) was a Spanish three-deck 112-gun ship of the line, named after Ferdinand, eldest surviving son of Charles IV of Spain and heir apparent with the title Prince of Asturias. She served during the Napoleonic wars escorting convoys, and fought at different times against both the British and French navies. Her invocation name was Los Santos Reyes (the Holy Kings).

Construction
She was built in Havana, Cuba in 1794 as part of the Santa Ana class designed by Romero de Landa. She was the last built of the eight ships of this class and was launched on 28 January 1794. Her construction was overseen by Honorato Bouyón.

Service
She left Havana on 26 February 1795 under the command of Brigadier Adrián de Valcárcel, and arrived in Cádiz on 17 May 1795 after escorting a valuable convoy.

Cape St Vincent
In 1797 she was commanded by Brigadier Antonio de Escaño y García,and was part of a squadron under Teniente General José de Córdova to escort another convoy. After completing that mission, but before reaching Cádiz, the squadron was surprised by a sudden storm which blew them further out to sea. While making their way back they encountered and were defeated by a British squadron on 14 February 1797 at the Battle of Cape St Vincent, The Príncipe de Asturias had 10 killed and 19 wounded, and helped save the Spanish flagship, the Santísima Trinidad, while it was under attack by British Commodore Horatio Nelson.

Trafalgar
At the Battle of Trafalgar, she was part of the Franco-Spanish fleet and the flagship of Spanish Teniente General (- Vice-Admiral) Federico Gravina, with Antonio de Escaño (now promoted Jefe de Escuadra (= Rear-Admiral)) as his deputy and Brigadier Rafael Hore as the ship's captain. During the battle Gravina found himself attacked by three British ships. The main mast and mizzen were shot through, rigging and sails shot to pieces. Gravina's left arm was shattered by grapeshot (he died a year later from wounds he received during the battle), and seeing a looming defeat, he managed to gather ten ships around the Príncipe de Asturias which suffered 50 killed and 110 wounded. After the battle the ship had to be towed by the French frigate Thémis and then underwent major repairs in Cádiz.

War with France
After the French invasion of Spain in 1808, she then served during the Spanish War of Independence (from French occupation), which was part of the Peninsular War. She was the flagship of Juan Ruiz de Apodaca during the capture of the Rosily Squadron of the French ships of the line Neptune, Algesiras, Argonaute, Héros, Plutón and the frigate Cornélie. In September 1810 she and the Santa Ana crossed the Atlantic to Havana to avoid capture by the French. She struck a rock and foundered in 1814, and her hull was ordered to be broken up in September 1820, although the remains were still visible off Havana in 1834.

References

Content in this article is translated from the existing Spanish Wikipedia article at :es:Príncipe de Asturias (1794); see its history for attribution.

Sources 

http://wrecksite.eu/wreck.aspx?215705
Batalla de Trafalgar. Navios Españoles
Militares y Navíos Españoles que participaron en Trafalgar (1) de Luís Aragón Martín
Militares y Navíos Españoles que participaron en Trafalgar (2) de Luís Aragón Martín
Todo a Babor. Batalla de Brión

1794 ships
Ships built in Cuba
Principe